Luke Kirby (also spelled Kirbie c. 1549 – 30 May 1582) was an English Catholic priest and martyr from the North of England, executed during the reign of Elizabeth I. He was is one of the Forty Martyrs of England and Wales.

Early life 
Kirby is said to have received his M.A. in England, probably at Cambridge, before converting to Catholicism at Louvain and entering Douai College in 1576. He was ordained a priest at Cambrai in September 1577 and left Rheims for England on 3 May 1578; however, he returned on 15 July and went to Rome. There he took the college oath at the English College, Rome, 23 April 1579. It was in Rome that he met the spy/informer Anthony Munday, who later gave false testimony against him.

Mission 
He was chosen to accompany Campion and Ralph Sherwin on their way to England, and the three set out from Rome on 14 April 1580, arriving in Rheims on 31 May. On 16 June he left Rheims with William Hartley. They made the journey to the coast by Douay and Dunkirk on foot.

Arrest 
In June 1580, he was arrested on landing at Dover, and committed to the Gatehouse, Westminster. On 4 December, he was transferred to the Tower, where he was subjected to the torture known as the "Scavenger's Daughter" for more than an hour on 9 December. Luke Kirby was tried at the same time as Edmund Campion, on the same charge of treason against the Queen, but his execution was deferred to the following May, and took place immediately after that of William Filby.

Execution 
Kirby was condemned on 17 November 1581, and from 2 April until the day he died, he was put in irons. With him at Tyburn died a Jesuit priest, Thomas Cottam, and two seminary priests: Lawrence Richardson and William Filby on 30 May 1582.

All were later beatified equipollently in 1886 by Pope Leo XIII. He was canonized as one of the Forty Martyrs of England and Wales in 1970.

Legacy and relic 
A relic, a corporal, which is housed in the English College in Rome, has the names of five priests. Kirby is one of those names stitched in the cloth.

A book entitled "Blessed Luke Kirby: Priest and Martyr" was written by Michael TH Banks, published nine months before the martyr's eventual canonization.

A portion of a stained glass window in St. Edmund's College, Ware depicts him.

References

1540s births
1582 deaths
English College, Douai alumni
English beatified people
Catholic saints who converted from Protestantism
Converts to Roman Catholicism
English Roman Catholic saints
Forty Martyrs of England and Wales
Martyred Roman Catholic priests
16th-century English Roman Catholic priests
People executed under the Tudors for treason against England
Executed English people
16th-century Christian saints
16th-century Roman Catholic martyrs
People executed under Elizabeth I